A zoot suit (occasionally spelled zuit suit) is a men's suit with high-waisted, wide-legged, tight-cuffed, pegged trousers, and a long coat with wide lapels and wide padded shoulders. It is most notable for its use as a cultural symbol among the Hepcat and Pachuco subcultures, although it was popular among African, Mexican, Filipino, Italian, and Japanese Americans in the 1940s.

The zoot suit originated in an African American comedy show in the 1930s and was popularized by jazz and jump blues singers. Cab Calloway called them "totally and truly American". The suits were worn mainly by men of color, including a young Malcolm X. During the rationing of World War II, they were criticized as a wasteful use of cloth, wool being rationed then. In 1942, the War Production Board issued restrictions aimed at stopping the sale of zoot suits.

Predominately Mexican and Black zoot suiters became victims of racial mob violence in the 1943 Zoot Suit Riots. Shortly after, wearing of the zoot suit was indefinitely banned in Los Angeles via a city wide ordinance. The zoot suit become an important symbol of cultural pride in the Chicano Movement. It experienced a brief resurgence in the swing revival scene in the 1990s. The suit is still worn by Chicanos for memorialization events and special occasions.

History

Hepcats 

 The suits were first associated with African-Americans in communities such as Harlem, Chicago, and Detroit in the 1930s, but were made popular nationwide by Jazz and Jump Blues musicians in the 1940s. According to the Oxford English Dictionary, the word "zoot" probably comes from a reduplication of suit. The creation of the zoot suit have been variously attributed to Harold C. Fox, a Chicago clothier and big-band trumpeter; Charles Klein and Vito Bagnato of New York City; Louis Lettes, a Memphis tailor; and Nathan (Toddy) Elkus, a Detroit retailer.

"A Zoot Suit (For My Sunday Gal)" was a 1942 song written by L. Wolfe Gilbert and Bob O'Brien. Jazz bandleader Cab Calloway frequently wore zoot suits on stage, including some with exaggerated details, such as extremely wide shoulders or overly draped jackets. He wore one in the 1943 film Stormy Weather. In his dictionary, Cab Calloway's Cat-ologue: A "Hepster's" Dictionary (1938), he called the zoot suit "the ultimate in clothes. The only totally and truly American civilian suit."

Pachucos and Pachucas 

Pachucos and Pachucas were early Chicano youth who participated in a subculture that fashioned zoot suits. The subculture emerged in El Paso, Texas in the late 1930s and quickly spread to Los Angeles. Pachucos and Pachucas embraced this style that challenged white American norms around race and gender norms The Mexican American zoot suit style was usually black, sharkskin, charcoal gray, dark blue, or brown in color with pinstripes. African American styles usually incorporated brighter colors, thick chalk stripes, floppy hats, and long chains more often than Mexican Americans. Both Pachucos and Hepcats functioned on the margins in American society. Some Pachucos and Hepcats shared solidarity or respect for one another because of this.

In the early 1940s, Pachucos were associated with violence and criminal behavior by the American media, which fueled anti-Mexican sentiment and especially negative views of the zoot suit style in Los Angeles. Pachucas, some of whom also wore the zoot suit, often with some modifications and additional accessories like dark lipstick, were seen as threatening to ideas of family stability and racial uplift, often shunned by their communities and the wider public. The zoot suits became framed as unpatriotic, referring to the excessiveness of cloth. In 1942, police from across Los Angeles arrested 600 Mexican Americans in the Sleepy Lagoon murder case, which involved the murder of one man, José Gallardo Díaz, at a party. Almost all of those arrested as allegedly potential suspects were wearing zoot suits.

Media coverage before and after the case sensationalized and further fanned the flames of hostile anti-Mexican sentiments in the city and abroad. This made some Mexican Americans hesitant to wear the zoot suit, since they did not want to be viewed as criminals simply for their style of dress. Some Pachucos became affiliated with early gangs in Los Angeles and embraced their presumed-to-be criminal status with the zoot suit. Others wore the zoot suit, but refused to refer to themselves as 'zoot suiters.' Mexican Americans who rejected Pachucos and zoot suit attire became known as 'squares' who were said to believe in assimilation and racial uplift theory. 

This tension exploded in 1943 in a series of anti-Mexican riots in Los Angeles that became termed the Zoot Suit Riots. For ten days, white U.S. servicemen cruised Mexican American neighborhoods searching for zoot suiters to attack. In some cases, youth as young as twelve were attacked and dragged out of establishments. Filipinos and Black zoot suiters were also targeted, such as a Black man who had his eye gouged out with a knife by "a crowd of whites." After being attacked, Mexican and Black zoot suiters rioted against white U.S. servicemen. On the fifth day of the riots, the zoot suiters repelled attackers in a coordinated effort. Busloads of police were brought in to rescue "the retreating servicemen," after which "dozens of Mexicans" were arrested. Military officials declared Los Angeles off limits to servicemen the next day.

After hearing of the event, an article for the Pittsburg Courier warned that Black zoot suiters could be the next target for "the patriotic lawlessness of men in uniform" and stated that both "Los Angeles Negro and Mexican zoot suiters are closer together than they are to members of their own racial group." Norris J. Nelson, Los Angeles City Council member, proposed outlawing zoot suits. An ordinance was then passed in Los Angeles that banned the wearing of zoot suits in the city indefinitely. Cesar Chavez sported zoot suit attire in his younger years and the zoot suit became an important cultural symbol for the Chicano Movement. The earliest youth who reclaimed the word Chicano as an identity of empowerment were in fact Pachucos.

White Americans 

Throughout the 1940s, white American views on the zoot suit varied. The jive talk of African American hepcats had spread, or been appropriated, among white middle class youth in the early 1940s. This began to erase the origins of the zoot suit as a Black cultural symbol, which made it more acceptable to white Americans. Prior to the Zoot Suit Riots, the zoot suit was sometimes positioned as a symbol of American individualism and even patriotism in comparison to the fascist uniform attire and regimentation of Nazi Germany. White and Black soldiers would sometimes be seen "zooting" their uniforms in war effort photos, with the press presenting the zoot suit as a symbol of youthful relatability rather than as an oppositional or unpatriotic symbol. Most of the visible tension surrounding the zoot suit prior to the riots was concentrated in the Los Angeles area regarding the spread of anti-Mexican sentiment among whites in the city.

Trinidad 

Zoot suits not only played a historical role in the subculture in the United States in the 1940s, but also shaped a new generation of men in Trinidad. These Trinidadian men who adopted this American fashion became referred to as the "saga boys"; they wore these suits and embraced the glamorous lifestyle that they represented. "Their fondness for the zoot suit, in particular signified a rejection of Anglo-centric precepts not only about fashion but, more profoundly, about manhood."

Therefore, although the "saga boys" had the appearance of adapting to the urban American way of life, they were in fact using this clothing and lifestyle as a way to improve their lives in Trinidad, rise above the restrictions that imperialism brought and create through this oppositional dress, a culture of their own.

Swing revival era 

In the swing revival era, which started in 1989 and carried to about 1998, the zoot suit experienced a small resurgence mostly based in nostalgia of the 1940s era, yet notably missed many of the racial dynamics that surrounded the zoot suit. Bands included The Brian Setzer Orchestra, Royal Crown Revue, and Cherry Poppin' Daddies. One of the popular songs of the era was the Cherry Poppin' Daddies' "Zoot Suit Riot," which presented the historical moment of the Zoot Suit Riots through a lens of masculine power.

Contemporary 

The zoot suit is regularly memorialized by the Chicano community today as a symbol of cultural pride. Some of this is owed to Luis Valdez's 1979 play Zoot Suit and its subsequent 1981 film, which carried knowledge of the era and interest in the style forward. Outside of memorialization events, such as those held on the anniversary of the Zoot Suit Riots, the zoot suit is still sometimes worn by Chicanos for special occasions, including proms, usually as a dual display of formal wear and cultural pride. It is also worn in certain urban areas in Mexico for similar purposes.

Characteristics

Traditionally, zoot suits have been worn with a fedora or pork pie hat color-coordinated with the suit, occasionally with a long feather as decoration, and pointy, French-style shoes.

A young Malcolm X, who wore zoot suits in his youth, described the zoot suit as: "a killer-diller coat with a drape shape, reet pleats, and shoulders padded like a lunatic's cell". Zoot suits usually featured a watch chain dangling from the belt to the knee or below, then back to a side pocket. A woman accompanying a man wearing a zoot suit would commonly wear a flared skirt and a long coat.

The amount of material and tailoring required made them luxury items, so much so that the U.S. War Production Board said that they wasted materials that should be devoted to the World War II war effort. When Life published photographs of zoot suiters in 1942, the magazine joked that they were "solid arguments for lowering the Army draft age to include 18-year-olds". This extravagance, which many considered unpatriotic in wartime, was a factor in the Zoot Suit Riots. To some, wearing the oversized suit was a declaration of freedom and self-determination, even rebelliousness.

Some observers claim that the "Edwardian-look" suits with velvet lapels worn by Teddy Boys in Britain are a derivative of the zoot suit.

Media 

 
 Book Revue- 1946 Looney Tunes short directed by Bob Clampett. It features Daffy Duck wearing Zoot Suit.
 Tin-Tan, a famous Mexican actor from the 1940s, wore zoot suits in his films.
 In the 1951 Three Stooges short "Three Arabian Nuts", Shemp finds a magic lamp complete with a genie (whom Shemp refers to as the 'Genius'). His first wish is for a sharp, new suit. The wish is promptly granted, leaving an overjoyed Shemp dressed in a spanking new zoot suit, complete with a long watch chain.
 Zoot Suit/I'm the Face – 1964 debut single by The Who
 Zoot-Suit Murders – 1978 murder mystery novel by Thomas Sanchez
 Zoot Suit – 1978 play by Luis Valdez
 
 Alright Single by Janet Jackson – The music video features Janet Jackson wearing zoot suit in homage to Cab Calloway
 Batman: The Animated Series The villain Joker is seen frequently wearing zoot suit
 The Mask (1994 film) film based on the comic book character by Dark Horse Comics starring Jim Carrey. The character is featured in a zoot suit
 Malcolm X (1992 film) film based on political leader "Malcolm X", starring Denzel Washington and directed by Spike Lee. Denzel Washington's portrayal of the young Malcolm X is seen in some scenes wearing a Zoot suit
 Zoot Suit Riot – 1997 compilation album by Cherry Poppin' Daddies

See also

References

Further reading
 Alvarez, Luis. The Power of the Zoot: Youth Culture and Resistance During World War II (University of California Press, 2008).
  Republished in:

External links
 The Zoot Suit Riots. Article about the zoot suit riots of 1943.

1930s fashion
1940s fashion
Suits (clothing)
Jazz culture
African-American cultural history
Italian-American culture
Italian-American history
Mexican-American history
Mexican-American culture
Filipino-American culture